The flora of Greenland consists of a total of 583 species or 614 taxa (species and subspecies) of vascular plants, of which 13 are endemic, and 87 taxa introduced by humans, most of which are naturalized.

Apiaceae
Angelica archangelica – native
Carum carvi – introduced
Ligusticum scoticum ssp. scoticum – native

Aspleniaceae
Asplenium viride – native

Asteraceae
Achillea millefolium ssp. millefolium – introduced
Antennaria affinis – native, endemic (microspecies)
Antennaria alpina
Antennaria angustata – native
Antennaria boecherana – native, endemic (microspecies)
Antennaria canescens – native
Antennaria compacta – native
Antennaria friesiana – native
Antennaria glabrata – native
Antennaria hansii – native, endemic (microspecies)
Antennaria intermedia – native, endemic (microspecies)
Antennaria porsildii – native
Antennaria sornborgeri – native
Antennaria subcanescens – native
Arnica angustifolia ssp. angustifolia – native
Artemisia borealis ssp. borealis – native
Artemisia vulgaris – introduced
Chamomilla recutita – introduced
Chamomilla suaveolens – introduced
Cirsium arvense – introduced
Cirsium helenioides – native, locally extinct
Crepis tectorum ssp. tectorum – introduced
Erigeron borealis – native
Erigeron compositus – native
Erigeron humilis – native
Erigeron uniflorus ssp. eriocephalus – native
Erigeron uniflorus ssp. uniflorus – native
Filaginella uliginosa – introduced
Hieracium sect. Alpina – native
Hieracium sect. Prenanthoidea – native
Hieracium sect. Subalpina – native
Hieracium sect. Tridentata – native
Leontodon autumnalis ssp. autumnalis – introduced (Norsemen)
Leucanthemum vulgare – introduced
Matricaria maritima ssp. phaeocephala – native
Matricaria perforata – introduced
Omalotheca norvegica – native
Omalotheca supina – native
Senecio vulgaris – introduced
Taraxacum sect. Arctica – native
Taraxacum sect. Borealia – native
Taraxacum sect. Spectabilia – native

Betulaceae
Alnus viridis ssp. crispa – native
Betula glandulosa – native
Betula nana ssp. nana – native
Betula pubescens ssp. minor – native

Boraginaceae
Asperugo procumbens – introduced
Mertensia maritima – native
Myosotis arvensis – introduced

Brassicaceae
Arabidopsis arenicola – native
Arabis alpina – native
Barbarea stricta – introduced
Barbarea vulgaris – introduced
Beringia bursifolia – native
Boechera holboellii – native
Brassica rapa ssp. sylvestris – introduced
Braya humilis ssp. arctica – native
Braya intermedia – native
Braya linearis – native
Braya novae-angliae – native
Braya purpurascens – native
Braya thorild-wulffii – native
Cakile edentula ssp. edentula – native
Capsella bursa-pastoris – introduced
Cardamine bellidifolia – native
Cardamine pratensis ssp. polemonioides – native
Cardaminopsis arenosa – introduced
Cochlearia groenlandica – native
Descurainia sophia – introduced
Draba alpina – native
Draba arctica ssp. ostenfeldii – native, endemic (subspecies)
Draba arctica ssp. arctica – native
Draba arctogena – native
Draba aurea – native
Draba cana – native
Draba cinerea – native
Draba corymbosa – native
Draba crassifolia – native
Draba fladnizensis – native
Draba glabella – native
Draba incana – native
Draba micropetala – native
Draba nivalis – native
Draba norvegica – native
Draba oblongata – native
Draba oxycarpa – native
Draba pauciflora – native
Draba sibirica – native
Draba subcapitata – native
Draba wahlenbergii – native
Erysimum redowskii(syn. E. pallasii) – nativeEutrema edwardsii – nativeLesquerella arctica – nativeRaphanus raphanistrum – introducedRorippa islandica ssp. islandica – nativeRorippa palustris ssp. palustris – introducedRorippa sylvestris – introducedSinapis arvensis – introducedSisymbrium altissimum – introducedSubularia aquatica ssp. americana – nativeThlaspi arvense – introduced

CallitrichaceaeCallitriche anceps – nativeCallitriche hamulata – nativeCallitriche hermaphroditica – nativeCallitriche palustris – native

CalochortaceaeStreptopus amplexifolius ssp. americanus – native

CampanulaceaeCampanula gieseckiana – nativeCampanula uniflora – native

CaryophyllaceaeArenaria humifusa – nativeArenaria pseudofrigida – nativeCerastium alpinum ssp. lanatum – nativeCerastium alpinum ssp. alpinum – nativeCerastium arcticum – nativeCerastium arvense – nativeCerastium beeringianum – nativeCerastium cerastoides – nativeCerastium fontanum ssp. vulgare – introducedCerastium fontanum ssp. fontanum – nativeCerastium regelii – nativeHonckenya peploides ssp. diffusa – nativeLychnis alpina ssp. americana – nativeMinuartia biflora – nativeMinuartia groenlandica – nativeMinuartia rossii ssp. rossiii – nativeMinuartia rubella – nativeMinuartia stricta – nativeSagina cespitosa – nativeSagina nivalis – nativeSagina nodosa – nativeSagina procumbens – nativeSagina saginoides – nativeSilene acaulis – nativeSilene furcata ssp. angustiflora – nativeSilene furcata ssp. furcata – nativeSilene latifolia ssp. alba – introducedSilene sorensenis – nativeSilene uralensis ssp. uralensis – nativeSilene vulgaris – introducedSpergula arvensis – introducedSpergularia canadensis – nativeStellaria borealis – nativeStellaria humifusa – nativeStellaria longifolia – nativeStellaria longipes – nativeStellaria media – introduced

ChenopodiaceaeAtriplex longipes ssp. praecox – nativeAtriplex patula – introducedChenopodium album – introduced

CornaceaeCornus canadensis – nativeCornus suecica – nativeCornus × unalaschkensis – native (hybrid)

CrassulaceaeRhodiola rosea ssp. rosea – nativeSedum acre – nativeSedum annuum – nativeSedum villosum – native

CupressaceaeJuniperus communis ssp. nana – native

CyperaceaeCarex acuta – nativeCarex aquatilis ssp. aquatilis – nativeCarex aquatilis ssp. stans – nativeCarex arctogena – nativeCarex atrata – nativeCarex atrofusca – nativeCarex bicolor – nativeCarex bigelowii ssp. bigelowii – nativeCarex bigelowii ssp. rigida – nativeCarex boecheriana – nativeCarex brunnescens ssp. brunnescens – nativeCarex buxbaumii – nativeCarex capillaris ssp. fuscidula – nativeCarex capillaris ssp. chlorostachys – nativeCarex capitata – nativeCarex chordorrhiza – nativeCarex curta – nativeCarex deflexa – nativeCarex demissa – nativeCarex disperma – nativeCarex fuliginosa ssp. misandra – nativeCarex glacialis – nativeCarex glareosa – nativeCarex gynocrates – nativeCarex holostoma – nativeCarex krausei ssp. porsildiana – nativeCarex lachenalii – nativeCarex lidii – nativeCarex lyngbyei ssp. lyngbyei – nativeCarex mackenziei – nativeCarex macloviana – nativeCarex magellanica ssp. irrigua – nativeCarex marina ssp. marina – nativeCarex marina ssp. pseudolagopina – nativeCarex maritima – nativeCarex membranacea Carex microglochin – nativeCarex miliaris Carex nardina ssp. hepburnii – nativeCarex nigra ssp. nigra – nativeCarex norvegica – nativeCarex panicea – nativeCarex parallela ssp. parallela – nativeCarex praticola – nativeCarex quasivaginata – nativeCarex rariflora – nativeCarex rhomalea Carex rostrata – nativeCarex rufina – nativeCarex rupestris – nativeCarex salina – nativeCarex miliaris – nativeCarex scirpoidea – nativeCarex stylosa – nativeCarex subspathacea ssp. subspathacea – nativeCarex supina ssp. spaniocarpa – nativeCarex trisperma – nativeCarex umbellata – nativeCarex ursina – nativeEleocharis acicularis ssp. acicularis – nativeEleocharis palustris – nativeEleocharis quinqueflora ssp. fernaldii – nativeEleocharis uniglumis – nativeEriophorum angustifolium – nativeEriophorum callitrix – nativeEriophorum scheuchzeri – nativeEriophorum × sorenseni – nativeEriophorum triste – nativeEriophorum vaginatum ssp. spissum – nativeKobresia myosuroides – nativeKobresia simpliciuscula ssp. subholarctica – nativeTrichophorum cespitosum – native

DiapensiaceaeDiapensia lapponica ssp. lapponica – native

DroseraceaeDrosera rotundifolia – native

DryopteridaceaeDryopteris expansa – nativeDryopteris filix-mas – nativeDryopteris fragrans – nativeDryopteris marginalis – nativePolystichum lonchitis – native

EmpetraceaeEmpetrum nigrum ssp. hermaphroditum – native

EquisetaceaeEquisetum arvense ssp. arvense – nativeEquisetum arvense ssp. boreale – nativeEquisetum hyemale – nativeEquisetum scirpoides – nativeEquisetum sylvaticum – nativeEquisetum variegatum ssp. variegatum – native

EricaceaeAndromeda polifolia ssp. glaucophylla – nativeAndromeda polifolia ssp. polifolia – nativeArctostaphylos alpinus – nativeArctostaphylos uva-ursi – nativeCassiope tetragona – nativeHarrimanella hypnoides – nativeLedum groenlandicum – nativeLedum palustre ssp. decumbens – nativeLoiseleuria procumbens – nativeOrthilia obtusata – nativePhyllodoce caerulea – nativePyrola grandiflora – nativePyrola minor – nativeRhododendron lapponicum – nativeVaccinium myrtillus – nativeVaccinium oxycoccos ssp. microphyllus – nativeVaccinium uliginosum ssp. microphyllum – nativeVaccinium vitis-idaea ssp. minus – native×Ledodendron vanhoeffeni – native, endemic (intergeneric hybrid)

FabaceaeAstragalus alpinus ssp. arcticus – probably introducedLathyrus japonicus – nativeLathyrus pratensis – introducedMedicago lupulina – introducedTrifolium hybridum – casualTrifolium pratense – introducedTrifolium repens – introducedVicia cracca – introduced (Norsemen)Vicia hirsuta – introducedVicia sativa ssp. nigra – introducedVicia sepium – introduced

GentianaceaeGentiana nivalis – nativeGentianella amarella ssp. acuta – nativeGentianella aurea – nativeGentianella detonsa – nativeGentianella tenella – nativeLomatogonium rotatum – native

GeraniaceaeErodium cicutarium – introducedGeranium pusillum – introducedGeranium sylvaticum – native

HaloragaceaeMyriophyllum alterniflorum – nativeMyriophyllum sibiricum – (Haloragaceae) - native

HippuridaceaeHippuris vulgaris – native

IridaceaeSisyrinchium montanum – native

IsoetaceaeIsoetes echinospora ssp. muricata – nativeIsoetes lacustris – native

JuncaceaeJuncus alpinoarticulatus ssp. alpestris – nativeJuncus arcticus ssp. arcticus – nativeJuncus biglumis – nativeJuncus bufonius ssp. bufonius – introducedJuncus bufonius ssp. ranarius – nativeJuncus castaneus ssp. castaneus – nativeJuncus filiformis – nativeJuncus gerardii ssp. gerardii – nativeJuncus squarrosus – nativeJuncus subtilis – nativeJuncus trifidus – nativeJuncus triglumis ssp. albescens – nativeJuncus triglumis ssp. triglumis – nativeLuzula nivalis – nativeLuzula arcuata – nativeLuzula confusa – nativeLuzula groenlandica – nativeLuzula multiflora ssp. frigida – nativeLuzula multiflora ssp. multiflora – nativeLuzula parviflora ssp. parviflora – nativeLuzula spicata – nativeLuzula wahlenbergii – native

JuncaginaceaeTriglochin palustris – native

LamiaceaeLamium amplexicaule – introducedLamium moluccellifolium – introducedLamium purpureum – introducedThymus praecox ssp. arcticus – native

LentibulariaceaePinguicula vulgaris – nativeUtricularia intermedia – nativeUtricularia minor – nativeUtricularia ochroleuca – native

LinnaeaceaeLinnaea borealis ssp. americana – native

LycopodiaceaeDiphasiastrum alpinum – nativeDiphasiastrum complanatum – nativeDiphasiastrum sitchense – nativeDiphasiastrum x zeilleri – nativeHuperzia arctica – nativeHuperzia selago – nativeLycopodium annotinum ssp. annotinum – nativeLycopodium dubium – nativeLycopodium lagopus – native

MalaceaeSorbus groenlandica – native

MelanthiaceaeTofieldia coccinea – nativeTofieldia pusilla – native

MenyanthaceaeMenyanthes trifoliata – native

MyrsinaceaeAnagallis arvensis – introducedTrientalis europaea – native

OnagraceaeChamaenerion latifolium – nativeEpilobium anagallidifolium – nativeEpilobium angustifolium – nativeEpilobium davuricum ssp. arcticum – nativeEpilobium hornemannii – nativeEpilobium lactiflorum – nativeEpilobium latifolium – nativeEpilobium palustre – native

OphioglossaceaeBotrychium boreale – nativeBotrychium lanceolatum – nativeBotrychium lunaria – nativeBotrychium minganense – nativeBotrychium multifidum – nativeBotrychium simplex – nativeOphioglossum azoricum – native

OrchidaceaeAmerorchis rotundifolia – nativeCorallorhiza trifida – nativeNeottia cordata – nativePlatanthera hyperborea – nativePseudorchis straminea – native

OrobanchaceaeBartsia alpina – nativeEuphrasia frigida – nativeMelampyrum sylvaticum – nativePedicularis capitata – nativePedicularis lanata – nativePedicularis flammea – nativePedicularis groenlandica – nativePedicularis hirsuta – nativePedicularis labradorica – nativePedicularis langsdorfii – nativePedicularis lapponica – nativePedicularis sudetica ssp. albolabiata – nativeRhinanthus minor ssp. groenlandicus – nativeRhinanthus minor ssp. minor – native

PapaveraceaePapaver dahlianum – nativePapaver cornwallisense Papaver dahlianum Papaver labradoricum Papaver lapponicum 

ParnassiaceaeParnassia kotzebuei – native

PlantaginaceaePlantago coronopus – casualPlantago lanceolata – introducedPlantago major – introducedPlantago maritima ssp. borealis – nativeVeronica alpina ssp. alpina – nativeVeronica alpina ssp. pumila – nativeVeronica arvensis – casualVeronica fruticans – nativeVeronica officinalis – introducedVeronica persica – casualVeronica serpyllifolia ssp. serpyllifolia – introducedVeronica wormskjoldii – native

PlumbaginaceaeArmeria maritima ssp. maritima – nativeArmeria maritima ssp. sibirica – native

PoaceaeAgrostis canina – nativeAgrostis capillaris – introducedAgrostis gigantea – nativeAgrostis mertensii – nativeAgrostis scabra – nativeAgrostis stolonifera – nativeAgrostis vinealis – nativeAlopecurus aequalis – nativeAlopecurus alpinus ssp. borealis – nativeAlopecurus geniculatus – introducedAlopecurus pratensis – introducedAnthoxanthum alpinum – nativeArctagrostis latifolia ssp. latifolia – nativeArctophila fulva – nativeAvenella flexuosa – nativeBromus hordeaceus – introducedBromus tectorum – introducedCalamagrostis canadensis ssp. langsdorfii – nativeCalamagrostis inexpansa – nativeCalamagrostis lapponica – nativeCalamagrostis neglecta ssp. neglecta – nativeCalamagrostis neglecta ssp. groenlandica – nativeCalamagrostis purpurascens var. purpurascens – nativeCalamagrostis purpurascens var. laricina – nativeCatabrosa aquatica – nativeDactylis glomerata – introducedDanthonia spicata – nativeDeschampsia alpina – nativeDeschampsia brevifolia – nativeDeschampsia cespitosa – introducedDeschampsia sukatschewii ssp. borealis – nativeDupontia fisheri – nativeElymus alaskanus ssp. hyperarcticus – nativeElymus repens – introducedElymus trachycaulus ssp. virescens – native, endemic (subspecies)Elymus violaceus – nativeFestuca baffinensis – nativeFestuca brachyphylla – nativeFestuca edlundiae – nativeFestuca groenlandica – native, endemicFestuca hyperborea – nativeFestuca pratensis – introducedFestuca rubra spp. fallax – introducedFestuca rubra ssp. arctica – nativeFestuca rubra	spp. rubra – nativeFestuca saximontana – nativeFestuca vivipara ssp. hirsuta – nativeFestuca vivipara ssp. vivipara – nativeFestuca vivipara ssp. glabra – nativeHierochloë alpina – nativeHierochloë odorata ssp. arctica – nativeLeymus arenarius – nativeLeymus mollis ssp. mollis – nativeLolium perenne – introducedNardus stricta – nativePhippsia algida ssp. algidiformis – nativePhippsia algida ssp. algida – nativePhleum alpinum – nativePhleum pratense ssp. pratense – nativePleuropogon sabinei – nativePoa abbreviata – nativePoa alpina – nativePoa annua – introducedPoa arctica ssp. arctica – nativePoa arctica ssp. caespitans – nativePoa flexuosa – nativePoa glauca – nativePoa hartzii – nativePoa nemoralis – nativePoa palustris – introducedPoa pratensis – nativePoa pratensis ssp. alpigena – nativePoa pratensis ssp. colpodea – nativePoa pratensis ssp. irrigata – nativePoa trivialis – introducedPuccinellia andersonii – nativePuccinellia angustata – nativePuccinellia bruggemannii – nativePuccinellia capillaris – nativePuccinellia deschampsioides – nativePuccinellia groenlandica – native, endemicPuccinellia laurentiana – nativePuccinellia maritima – nativePuccinellia nutkaensis – nativePuccinellia phryganodes – nativePuccinellia porsildii – nativePuccinellia pumila – nativePuccinellia rosenkrantzii – native, endemicPuccinellia tenella ssp. langeana – nativePuccinellia vaginata – nativePuccinellia vahliana – nativeTrisetum spicatum – nativeVahlodea atropurpurea – native

PolemoniaceaePolemonium boreale – native

PolygalaceaePolygala serpyllifolia – probably introduced

PolygonaceaeBistorta vivipara – nativeFallopia convolvulus – introducedKoenigia islandica – nativeOxyria digyna – nativePersicaria lapathifolia – introducedPersicaria maculosa – introducedPolygonum aviculare ssp. boreale – introducedRumex acetosella ssp. acetosella – introducedRumex acetosella ssp. tenuifolius  – nativeRumex acetosella ssp. arenicola – nativeRumex alpestris ssp. lapponicus – nativeRumex longifolius – introducedRumex obtusifolius – introduced

PolypodiaceaePolypodium sibiricum – native

PortulacaceaeMontia fontana – native

PotamogetonaceaePotamogeton alpinus ssp. tenuifolius – nativePotamogeton gramineus – nativePotamogeton groenlandicus – native, endemicPotamogeton natans – nativePotamogeton perfoliatus ssp. perfoliatus – nativePotamogeton praelongus – nativeStuckenia filiformis ssp. alpina – nativeStuckenia filiformis ssp. filiformis – native

PrimulaceaeAndrosace septentrionalis – nativePrimula egaliksensis – nativePrimula stricta – native

RanunculaceaeAnemone richardsonii – nativeBatrachium confervoides – nativeCoptis trifoliata – nativeRanunculus acris ssp. acris – nativeRanunculus arcticus – nativeRanunculus auricomus – nativeRanunculus cymbalaria – nativeRanunculus glacialis – nativeRanunculus hyperboreus ssp. hyperboreus – nativeRanunculus lapponicus – nativeRanunculus nivalis – nativeRanunculus pygmaeus – nativeRanunculus repens – introducedRanunculus reptans – nativeRanunculus sabinei – nativeRanunculus subrigidus Ranunculus sulphureus – nativeThalictrum alpinum – native

RosaceaeAcomastylis rossii – nativeAlchemilla alpina – nativeAlchemilla filicaulis – nativeAlchemilla glomerulans – nativeAlchemilla vestita – nativeAlchemilla wichurae – nativeArgentina anserina – nativeArgentina egedei ssp. egedei – nativeComarum palustre – nativeDryas integrifolia – nativeDryas octopetala ssp. punctata – nativeGeum rivale – nativeGeum rossii Potentilla chamissonis – nativePotentilla crantzii – nativePotentilla hookeriana – nativePotentilla hyparctica ssp. hyparctica – nativePotentilla insularis – nativePotentilla nivea ssp. nivea – nativePotentilla nivea ssp. subquinata – nativePotentilla norvegica ssp. norvegica – introducedPotentilla pulchella ssp. pulchella – nativePotentilla ranunculus – nativePotentilla rubella – native, endemicPotentilla rubricaulis – nativePotentilla stipularis – nativePotentilla vahliana – nativeRubus chamaemorus – nativeRubus idaeus ssp. idaeus – nativeRubus saxatilis – nativeSibbaldia procumbens – nativeSibbaldiopsis tridentata – native

RubiaceaeGalium album – introducedGalium aparine – introducedGalium boreale – nativeGalium brandegei – nativeGalium triflorum – nativeGalium uliginosum – introducedGalium verum – introduced

SalicaceaeSalix arctica – nativeSalix arctophila – nativeSalix glauca ssp. callicarpaea – nativeSalix glauca ssp. glauca – nativeSalix herbacea – nativeSalix reticulata – nativeSalix uva-ursi – native

SaxifragaceaeChrysosplenium tetrandrum – nativeMicranthes stellaris, syn. Saxifraga stellaris – nativeSaxifraga aizoides – nativeSaxifraga cernua – nativeSaxifraga cespitosa ssp. cespitosa – nativeSaxifraga foliolosa – nativeSaxifraga hieracifolia – nativeSaxifraga hirculus – nativeSaxifraga hyperborea – nativeSaxifraga nathorstii – native, endemicSaxifraga nivalis – nativeSaxifraga oppositifolia ssp. oppositifolia – nativeSaxifraga paniculata – nativeSaxifraga platysepala – nativeSaxifraga rivularis – nativeSaxifraga rosacea – nativeSaxifraga tenuis – nativeSaxifraga tricuspidata – native

ScrophulariaceaeLimosella aquatica – nativeLinaria vulgaris – introducedVerbascum thapsus – casual

SelaginellaceaeSelaginella rupestris – nativeSelaginella selaginoides – native

SparganiaceaeSparganium angustifolium – nativeSparganium hyperboreum – native

ThelypteridaceaePhegopteris connectilis – native

UrticaceaeUrtica dioica ssp. dioica – introducedUrtica urens – introduced

ViolaceaeViola adunca – nativeViola arvensis – introducedViola canina ssp. montana – nativeViola palustris – nativeViola selkirkii – native

WoodsiaceaeAthyrium distentifolium ssp. americanum – nativeAthyrium filix-femina ssp. angustum – nativeCystopteris fragilis – nativeCystopteris montana – nativeGymnocarpium dryopteris – nativeWoodsia alpina – nativeWoodsia glabella – nativeWoodsia ilvensis – native

ZosteraceaeZostera marina'' – native

References

Flora of the Arctic
Greenland